This is a list of German television related events from 1963.

Events

Debuts
 heute (1963-present)

Television shows

1950s
Tagesschau (1952–present)

Ending this year

Births
5 March - Thomas Hermanns, TV host, director & comedian
2 July - Jens Riewa, TV host & news analyst
10 November - Cordula Stratmann, comedian & TV host

Deaths